Claude Jenkins (1877–1959) was an Anglican clergyman, theologian and historian.

Biography 
He became Canon of Christ Church and Regius Professor of Ecclesiastical Historyat Oxford University in 1934. He was Lambeth Librarian from 1910 until 1952.

He was famous for collecting books, having an estimated 30,000 at the time of his death:

References

1877 births
1959 deaths
20th-century English Anglican priests
Regius Professors of Ecclesiastical History
English Christian theologians
English Anglican theologians